Action League Now! is a stop motion children's television series that was originally part of All That and then KaBlam! on Nickelodeon, and was later spun off into its own show.  A total of 51 episodes have aired, with an average time of four minutes each.

Shorts

All That (1995)

Episodes

Season 1 (1996)

Season 2 (1997)

Season 3 (1998)

Season 4 (1999–2000)

Episodes (2001–2002)

This is a list of the Action League Now! episodes that aired as a whole series. These 30-minute blocks contained four shorts per airing, with activities such as "Behind the Plastic", "Ask the League?" and "Action IQ" placed in-between. The episode titles signified the subject matter of the shorts that were going to be seen (for example, "Action League Rocks!" contained four shorts that all had to do with music). Not all shorts were put into episodes.

As mentioned before, a majority of these shorts were previously seen on KaBlam!, and only two in total were brand new.
 Action League Goes to the Movies (Armageddon Outta Here / Incident at Chlorine Lake / Yurplastic Park / A Star is Torn) (November 25, 2001)
 Smash Hits (Road to Ruin / Nightmare on Memory Lane / Roughing the Passer / And Justice for None) (December 2, 2001)
 Science Friction (Tears of a Clone / What's Eating The Flesh / The Quarky Syndrome / Science Fiction Parody) (December 9, 2001)
 Action League Rocks! (Rock-A-Big Baby / Hit of Horror / In the Whine of Fire) (December 16, 2001)
 Stinky Diver: Behind the Mask (Flippers of Fury / Mad Dogs and Englishmen / Stink or Swim / Winds of Evil) (December 23, 2001)
 The Chief: Look Back in Anger (Hey! Who Stole My Face? / Fatter / Grief for The Chief / Dog Day Afterschool) (December 30, 2001)
 I'll Melt for You (Meltman at Large / Melty's Girl / Tune Up of Terror / In the Belly of the Beast) (January 6, 2002)
 Monster Mashed (Melty Dearest / Rags to Riches / Wrath of Spotzilla) (January 13, 2002)
 The Many Faces of Evil (Revenge of Hodge Podge / A Flesh of Brilliance / Big Baby / Voice of Treason) (January 20, 2002)
 His Dishonor (Turkey of Terror / Chickie Chickie Bang Bang / No Fly Zone / Testimony of Terror) (January 27, 2002)
 Naked Came the Numskull (The Naked and the Dumb / Danger for a Dignitary / Flesh and Blood / RoboFlesh) (February 3, 2002)
 Thunder Girl: Tracking The Storm (Thunder and Lightning / Caged Thunder/ Art of Thunder/ Sinkhole of Doom) (Series Finale) (February 10, 2002)

External links
 Action League Now! episodes
 
 Action League Now! on !

All That
KaBlam!
Action League Now! episodes lists of
Action League Now!